Charles Reginald Handfield (26 August 1878 – 6 May 1915) was an Australian-born South African first-class cricketer and soldier.

Handfield was born in South Yarra in August 1878 and was educated at Malvern Grammar School, where he was the captain of the cricket and football teams. After graduating in 1901, he and his brother George emigrated to South Africa, where he joined the 1st Imperial Light Horse on the outbreak of the Second Boer War. He served in the Orange Free State and Transvaal and was promoted to corporal in 1902.

Handfield appeared in one first-class Currie Cup cricket match for Transvaal against Border on 23 March 1909. During the match, which took place at the Newlands Rugby Ground, Handfield caught Charles Johnson and Norman Norton and scored 5 runs before being bowled by Arthur Sprenger.

At the outbreak of the First World War in August 1914, Handfield enlisted in the Natal Light Horse, once again with the rank of corporal. The regiment was engaged in the South West Africa campaign, in which they were pushing German forces into German West Africa. Handfield was wounded in action during a battle at Gibeon on 27 April 1915 and died of his wounds on 7 May. He is buried at the Gibeon Station Cemetery.

References

1878 births
1915 deaths
Cricketers from Victoria (Australia)
Australian cricketers
Australian expatriate cricketers
Australian expatriate sportspeople in South Africa
Gauteng cricketers
People educated at Caulfield Grammar School
Australian emigrants to South Africa
South African Army personnel
British Army personnel of the Second Boer War
People from South Yarra, Victoria
South African military personnel killed in World War I